Lõoke is an Estonian surname meaning lark. People bearing the surname Lõoke include:

Artur Lõoke (1909–1950), railwayman, who defected Soviet Union  by escaping to Finland (:et)
Marika Lõoke (born 1951), architect
Urmas Lõoke (born 1950), architect

Estonian-language surnames